Hana Doušová (born 5 March 1949) is a Czech basketball player. She competed in the women's tournament at the 1976 Summer Olympics.

References

External links
 

1949 births
Living people
Czech women's basketball players
Olympic basketball players of Czechoslovakia
Basketball players at the 1976 Summer Olympics
People from Turnov
Sportspeople from the Liberec Region